Francisco Julio Rodríguez Martínez (born 18 April 1984), sometimes known simply as Julio, is a Spanish footballer who plays for Aravaca CF as a left back.

Club career
Born in Madrid, Julio graduated from local CD Leganés' youth system, making his senior debuts with the reserves. On 25 January 2004 he played his first official game with the first team, featuring the last 18 minutes in a 3–1 away win over Córdoba CF in the Segunda División.

In the following years, Julio competed in the Segunda División B and Tercera División, representing UD Marbella, Celta de Vigo B, RSD Alcalá, CD Guadalajara, UD Socuéllamos and CD Olímpic de Xàtiva.

References

External links

1984 births
Living people
Footballers from Madrid
Spanish footballers
Association football defenders
Segunda División players
Segunda División B players
Tercera División players
CD Leganés B players
CD Leganés players
Marbella FC players
Celta de Vigo B players
RSD Alcalá players
CD Guadalajara (Spain) footballers
CD Olímpic de Xàtiva footballers